Ibrahim Salih Mohammed Al-Yacoub (born October 16, 1966; in Qatif, Saudi Arabia) is wanted by the United States government in connection with the June 25, 1996 attack on the Khobar Towers complex near Dhahran, Saudi Arabia.  He was indicted by a Federal Grand Jury in the United States District Court for the Eastern District of Virginia on June 21, 2001 on 46 separate criminal counts including murder for his role in the attack, which was led by Ahmed Ibrahim Al-Mughassil.

Months after his 2001 indictment in the 1996 attack, Al-Yacoub, then still a U.S. fugitive, was placed on the initial list of the FBI's top 22 Most Wanted Terrorists, which was released to the public by President Bush on October 10, 2001.

Al Yacoub is alleged to be a member of the pro-Iran Saudi Hizballah, or Hizballah Al-Hijaz, meaning Party of God, being led by Al-Mughassil.  The group is one of a number of related Hezbollah terrorist organizations operating in Saudi Arabia, Lebanon, Kuwait and Bahrain, among other places, and was outlawed in Saudi Arabia.

A reward of up to $5 million is being offered by the Rewards for Justice Program for information leading directly to the apprehension or conviction of Ibrahim Salih Mohammed Al-Yacoub.

Personal Information

Terrorist Activity

Khobar Towers plot 1996 
The 2001 indictment traces the carefully organized 1996 bomb plot back to on or about 1993 when Al-Yacoub was part of a team instructed by Al Mughassil to begin surveillance of Americans in Saudi Arabia, including at the location of Khobar Towers as early as 1994.

Al-Yacoub remained one of the planners of the attack on Khobar Towers through at least early June 1996. The cell finalized plans on the evening of June 25, 1996, for the attack that night. In the subsequent blast, 19 American servicemen were killed, and 372 were wounded.

Following the terrorist attack, the leaders fled the Khobar area and Saudi Arabia using fake passports.

The United States indicts that Ibrahim Al-Yacoub was also heavily involved in the recruitment of new terrorist members, assisting and executing terror attacks.

Terrorist Liaison 
Al-Yacoub is also said to have worked as a liaison between his organisation and the Lebanese and Iranian branches of Hezbollah, especially information transfer.

References

External links
 Rewards for Justice
 Al-Yacoub profile at FBI Most Wanted Terrorists Site

1966 births
Living people
Saudi Arabian mass murderers
Saudi Arabian Shia Muslims
FBI Most Wanted Terrorists
Fugitives wanted by the United States
Individuals designated as terrorists by the United States government
Place of birth missing (living people)